Kot Allah Dad is a small village in Tank District of Khyber Pakhtunkhwa, located about two miles West of Tank-Dera Ismail Khan road and about 50 Kilometers from the border of South Waziristan. An archaeological site of an ancient civilization exists nearby.

References

External links
 Kot Allah Dad Map

Populated places in Tank District